Karipur (also spelt Karippur) is a locality in the Kondotty taluk of the Malappuram district of Kerala, India, 25 km (16 mi) from the city of Malappuram. It is best known as the site of Karipur International Airport, serving travellers of mainly the South Malabar region. Other than that, it is a small hamlet that comes under the jurisdiction of Kondotty Municipality and Pallikkal gram panchayat. Karipur forms a portion of the Malappuram metropolitan area as of 2011 Census.

Transportation
Karippur village connects to other parts of India through Kondotty town on the west and Nilambur town on the east.  National highway No.66 passes through Pulikkal and the northern stretch connects to Goa and Mumbai.  The southern stretch connects to Cochin and Trivandrum.  National Highway No.966 starts from Ramanatukara and connects to Malappuram, Palakkad and  Coimbatore through National Highway 544. Karipur International Airport is situated in this village. This airport is notorious for gold smuggling in India.The nearest major railway stations are at Feroke(18 km away) and Parappanangadi(20 km away).

Schools
 Ideal Higher Secondary School, Dharmagiri

References

External links

Cities and towns in Malappuram district
Kondotty area